Iraklı Uznadze (born May 18, 1972) is a Georgian-Turkish judoka. In 1994-95 he was fighting under name Irfan Toker.

Achievements

References

1972 births
Living people
Turkish male judoka
Judoka at the 1996 Summer Olympics
Olympic judoka of Turkey
European champions for Turkey
20th-century Turkish people
21st-century Turkish people